The Mosman Bay ferry service (numbered F6) is a commuter ferry route in Sydney, New South Wales, Australia. Part of the Sydney Ferries network, it serves several Lower North Shore suburbs around Mosman Bay.

Services begin on the southern side of Sydney Harbour at Circular Quay, then head northeast to the Cremorne Point wharf. Proceeding around Robertsons Point, ferries travel up Mosman Bay to the terminus. Services operate every half an hour on weekdays and every hour at night and on weekends.

Wharves

Circular Quay

Circular Quay wharf is located at the northern end of the Sydney central business district. The locality of Circular Quay is a major Sydney transport hub, with a large ferry, heavy rail, light rail and bus interchange.

Cremorne Point

Cremorne Point ferry wharf is located at the end of Milson Road, at the southern end of Cremorne Point. It consists of a single wharf.

The wharf was extensively damaged during a storm in June 2007. It reopened in September 2007.

It was rebuilt between October 2014 and February 2015.

South Mosman

South Mosman ferry wharf is located at the end of Musgrave St, and hence is marked "Musgrave St. Wharf" on some publications. It serves the suburb of Mosman and consists of a single wharf.

Old Cremorne

Old Cremorne ferry wharf is located near Kareela Road in Cremorne Point. It serves central area of the suburb and consists of a single wharf.

Mosman Bay

Mosman Bay ferry wharf is located at the end of Avenue Road, Mosman. It consists of a single wharf.

The wharf was rebuilt between March and October 2014.

Patronage
The following table shows the patronage of Sydney Ferries network for the year ending 30 June 2022.

References

Ferry transport in Sydney